Bardolino is a comune (municipality) in the Province of Verona in the Italian region Veneto, located about  west of Venice and about  northwest of Verona.

Geography 
Located on the eastern shore of Lake Garda, Bardolino borders the following municipalities: Affi, Cavaion Veronese, Costermano, Garda, Lazise, Manerba del Garda, Moniga del Garda, Padenghe sul Garda, and Pastrengo. The economy is mostly based on tourism and production of wine (including the Bardolino DOC).

History

Archaeological excavations have proven the presence of humans in the area since prehistoric times, in the area of Cisano. There also traces of ancient Romans, though the modern settlement dates to the early Middle Ages, when Berengar of Italy (983) had a castle built here. In that period the area was under the suzerainty of the Bobbio Abbey.

In the 12th century Bardolino is mentioned as a free commune, and later was under the Scaliger of Verona, who enlarged the fortifications to encompass the whole village. After their fall, it became part of the Republic of Venice which had a marine base here. In 1526 it was sacked by the Landsknechts. Under the Lombardy-Venetia, it was an Austrian administrative center: in 1848 it revolted against them in the wake of the first Piedmontese victories in the First Italian War of Independence. However, later the Austrians retaliated with ravages and shootings. It was annexed to the newly formed Kingdom of Italy in 1866.

Main sights
 Church of San Zeno (mid-9th century), one of the few Carolingian edifices in Italy. It has traces of original fresco decorations.
 Church of San Severo (11th-12th centuries). It has 12th-14th-century frescoes, and an early medieval crypt.
 Church of San Nicolò and San Severo (1830-1844) by the architect Bartolomeo Giuliari, parochial church.
 Monastery of San Colombano (11th century), a dependency of the Bobbio Abbey
 Pieve of Santa Maria, rebuilt in the 12th century above a 7th-century early Christian church, which had been in turn constructed over an ancient pagan temple.
 City walls (12th century)
 Villa Bottagisio (19th century).
 Villa Guerrieri (19th century).
 Villa Ferrari (19th century).
 Casa Ottolenghi (1974-1978), designed by Carlo Scarpa.
 Museo Sisàn, dedicated to fishing and bird hunting in the Lake Garda area.
 Zeni Wine Museum, founded in 1991 as part of the Zeni Cellar. It exposes objects above all of Veronese wine culture. Free entry for individual visitors, against reservation for groups.

References

External links

 Official website
 Bardolino Tourist Guide

Cities and towns in Veneto
Populated places on Lake Garda